Eupithecia meridiana is a moth in the family Geometridae. It is found in Chile (Aconcagua).

The length of the forewings is about 10 mm for males and 11 mm for females. The base, median field and three marginal spots on the forewings are grey irrorated with brown scales. The antemedian and postmedian area and two marginal spots are white or greyish white. The hindwings are grey with a brownish suffusion and a wide, wavy greyish white transverse stripe. Adults are on wing in December.

Etymology
The specific name is derived from  meridianus (meaning southern).

References

Moths described in 1994
meridiana
Moths of South America
Endemic fauna of Chile